Lynne Ewing is an American author and screenwriter who has written 24 young adult novels, including the Daughters of the Moon, Sons of the Dark, and the Sisters of Isis series. Her books have been translated into seven languages.

Her first book, Drive-By (1996), was an ALA Quick Pick for Reluctant Young Adult Readers and a New York Public Library Book for the Teen Age. The book also received the 1999 Arizona Young Readers Award. Her second book, Party Girl (1999), was an ALA Quick Pick for Reluctant Young Adult Readers, an Amazon Editor's Choice, and a Teen People recommended read. The book was adapted into a film titled Living the Life.

Her book The Lure (2014) was an ALA In the Margins 2015 top-ten title for Youths in Custody. In a review of the novel, which she rated as appropriate for high school–age students, Coats compared The Lure to The Outsiders, arguing that "circumstances [of the characters in The Lure] are raw to the power of ten compared to that book".

In a 2012 study, Guerra concluded that Drive-By and Party Girl, among a number of other titles, were likely to "engage" reluctant readers among youth at risk for incarceration.

Lehtonen discusses Goddess of the Night (2000), the first volume of the Daughters of the Moon series, in a study of young adult fiction. Lehtonen observes that Goddess of the Night uses the magical power of invisibility as a means to explore the "empowerment" of Vanessa Cleveland, the novel's main character.

Ewing is a member of Sisters in Crime and the Mystery Writers of America. She divides her time between Washington, D.C., Montreal and Lyon, France.

Books 
 Drive-By (HarperCollins, 1996)
 Party Girl (Random House, 1999)
 Daughters of the Moon (Disney Hyperion, 2000–2007)
 Sons of the Dark (Disney Hyperion, 2004–2005)
 Sisters of Isis (Disney Hyperion, 2007–2008)
 The Lure (HarperCollins, 2014)

References

Sources

External links

Year of birth missing (living people)
20th-century American novelists
20th-century American women writers
21st-century American novelists
21st-century American women writers
American women screenwriters
American women novelists
Living people